The District of Columbia Inventory of Historic Sites is a register of historic places in Washington, D.C. that are designated by the District of Columbia Historic Preservation Review Board (HPRB), a component of the District of Columbia Government.

Historic Preservation Review Board 
The District of Columbia Historic Preservation Review Board (HPRB) designates historic structures and districts and advises the Mayor of the District of Columbia on historic preservation matters. Members of the HPRB are appointed by the mayor and are approved by the Council of the District of Columbia.

The D.C. Inventory of Historic Sites was created in 1964, and was originally compiled by the predecessor to the HPRB, the Joint Committee on Landmarks of the National Capital. , the Inventory includes approximately 750 historic sites and 50 historic districts.

Criteria 
The criteria for designation are defined by the D.C. Municipal Regulations at DCMR 10-C, Section C-201. Designated properties must:

See also 

 National Register of Historic Places listings in Washington, D.C.
 List of National Historic Landmarks in Washington, D.C.
 History of Washington, D.C.

References

External links